Architectural Resources Group (or ARG; also known as Architects, Planners & Conservators, Inc.) is a firm that was founded in 1980 by Bruce Judd and Steve Farneth in San Francisco, CA. It began by providing professional services in the fields of architecture and urban planning with particular expertise in the area of historic preservation. In 2000, David Wessel, a Principal of ARG, founded a separate conservation-contracting division, ARG Conservation Services which operates under the same roof as ARG. By 2005, the firm had expanded to a full-service architecture firm with 50+ employees. ARG also opened offices in Pasadena serving Southern California, and Portland, Oregon, serving the Pacific Northwest.

Company

Because of the complex range of issues common to preservation projects, the firm associates with consultants in diverse fields such as architectural history, preservation technology, building pathology, urban planning, building materials, engineering, real estate, and economics.

ARG was among the first architecture firms in the United States to include architectural conservators as staff members. ARG has provided a range of services for various National Historic Landmarks, buildings listed on the National Register of Historic Places, local historic districts, and other culturally significant sites.

Awards
The firm and its projects have received more than 100 awards in design excellence, conservation, and planning, including those sponsored by the National Trust for Historic Preservation, the American Institute of Architects, the California Governor's Office, and the California Preservation Foundation. In 2006, ARG received the Firm of the Year Award from the AIA California Council. In 2016, ARG was honored with a Palladio Award for its Steven S. Koblik Education and Visitor Center at the Huntington Library.

Affiliations
ARG retains close alliances and involvement with national and international preservation policy and advocacy organizations such as the Office of the United States Secretary of the Interior, National Trust for Historic Preservation, ICOMOS, DoCoMoMo, the Association for Preservation Technology International, and the American Institute for Conservation of Historic and Artistic Works.

Notable projects

Architecture and cultural resource preservation 
 Buena Vista Winery, Restoration and Seismic Strengthening, Sonoma, California
 California Institute of Technology, Linde + Robinson Laboratory for Global Environmental Sciences, Pasadena, California
 Cavallo Point, the Lodge at the Golden Gate, Fort Baker, Golden Gate National Recreation Area, California
 Conservatory of Flowers, Restoration & Repair, Golden Gate Park, San Francisco, California
 Curry Village Lounge and Registration Buildings, Yosemite National Park, California
 Filoli Estate, New Visitor Center and Café Addition, Woodside, California
 Furnace Creek Visitor Center, Death Valley National Park, California
 Huntington Library, Art Collection, and Botanical Gardens, Education and Visitor Center, San Marino, California
 Inn at the Presidio, Presidio of San Francisco, San Francisco, California
 Napa Valley Opera House,  Rehabilitation & New Addition, Napa, California
 Napa Valley Vintners, Jackse Barn, Adaptive reuse, Napa, California
 Oregon State Hospital, Adaptive Reuse and Restoration, Salem, Oregon
 Pasadena City Hall, Seismic Retrofit, Rehabilitation and Repairs, Pasadena, California
 Pasadena Conservatory of Music, Pasadena, California
 Sunset Center, Rehabilitation and New Addition, Carmel-By-The-Sea, California

Conservation 
 450 Sutter Street, Window Stabilization, Rehabilitation & Replacement, San Francisco, California
 The 5th Avenue Theatre, Restoration, Seattle, Washington
 Angel Island Immigration Station, San Francisco Bay, California
 Charles Krug Winery, Rehabilitation and Structural Strengthening, Napa Valley, California
 Coit Memorial Tower, Mural Restoration and Waterproofing, San Francisco, California
 David Ireland Residence, Conservation, San Francisco, California
 Mark Hopkins Hotel, Design Services, San Francisco, California
 New Mission Theater, Restoration, San Francisco, California
 Old Saint Mary's Cathedral, Restoration and Seismic Strengthening, San Francisco, California
 San Francisco Maritime Museum, Restoration, San Francisco Maritime National Historical Park, California
 Washington State Capitol Campus, Conservation, Olympia, Washington
 Watts Towers State Historic Park, Los Angeles, California

Historic structures reports 
 The Ahwahnee Hotel, Yosemite National Park, California
 First Church of Christ, Scientist, Berkeley, California
 Frank Lloyd Wright-Designed Hanna House, Stanford University, California
 Los Angeles Union Station, Los Angeles, California
 McConaghy House, Hayward, California
 Old United States Mint Building, San Francisco, California
 Rancho Los Alamitos, Long Beach, California
 Reno Depot, Reno, Nevada
 State Forester's Office Building, Salem, Oregon
 The Village Green, Baldwin Hills, California
 Washington State Capitol, Olympia, Washington

Design review and historic resource surveys 
 Century Plaza Hotel, Historic Resource Assessment and Impacts Analysis, Los Angeles, California
 City of Anaheim, Historic Resource Survey, Anaheim, California
 City of Burbank, Historic Sign Survey, Burbank, California
 Hawaiʻi Volcanoes National Park, Crater Rim Drive Historic Road Inventory, Hawaii, Hawaii
 Monterey Old Town National Historic Landmark District, Historic Context Statement and Survey, Monterey, California
 Oregon Parks and Recreation Department, Context Statement and Inventory, Oregon
 Palo Alto Children's Library, Section 106 Compliance, Palo Alto, California
 Pier 27 Cruise Ship Terminal, San Francisco, California
 Presidio Design Guidelines, Presidio of San Francisco, California
 Survey LA, Citywide Historic Resources Survey, Los Angeles, California
 Tomales Design Guidelines, Tomales, California

Referencesthe

External links 

 Official website

Architecture firms based in California
Architecture firms based in Oregon
Companies based in San Francisco
Companies based in Portland, Oregon
Companies based in Pasadena, California
Architecture in the San Francisco Bay Area
1980 establishments in California
New Classical architects